Goran Paulić (born 31 March 1965) is a former football player and coach.

Playing career
As a player, he has played for clubs in Croatia, Austria, Malaysia, Singapore and Hong Kong.

Managerial career
As a coach, he has coached the Hong Kong national team (in a joint head coach role with Dejan Antonić), Hong Kong under-23 squad, Hong Kong Rangers, Dongguan Nancheng and Johor Darul Ta'zim II.

Games of Hong Kong team coached by Dejan Antonić and Goran Paulić

International games of Hong Kong

References

External links
 

1965 births
Living people
Sportspeople from Zagreb
Croatian people of Serbian descent
Association football forwards
Yugoslav footballers
Croatian footballers
Balestier Khalsa FC players
Melaka United F.C. players
NK Istra players
Hong Kong Rangers FC players
Croatian Football League players
Hong Kong First Division League players
Croatian expatriate footballers
Expatriate footballers in Singapore
Croatian expatriate sportspeople in Singapore
Expatriate footballers in Malaysia
Croatian expatriate sportspeople in Malaysia
Expatriate footballers in Austria
Croatian expatriate sportspeople in Austria
Expatriate footballers in Hong Kong
Croatian expatriate sportspeople in Hong Kong
Croatian football managers
Goran Paulić
Croatian expatriate football managers
Expatriate football managers in Hong Kong
Expatriate football managers in China
Croatian expatriate sportspeople in China
Expatriate football managers in Malaysia